Loch Migdale is a freshwater loch (Lake) near Bonar Bridge, in Sutherland, Highland, Scotland.

The loch contains a crannog (artificial-island home) dating from the Iron Age.

References 

Migdale
Migdale
Landforms of Sutherland